Zaglik-e Olya (also Romanized as Zaglīk-e ‘Olyā; also known as  Zaklak-e Bālā and Zaklīk-e Bālā) is a village in Owch Hacha Rural District, in the Central District of Ahar County, East Azerbaijan Province, Iran. At the 2006 census, its population was 70, in 15 families.

References 

Populated places in Ahar County